Lado Senčar (17 May 1908 – 1998) was a Slovenian cross-country skier. He competed in the men's 50 kilometre event at the 1936 Winter Olympics.

References

1908 births
1998 deaths
Slovenian male cross-country skiers
Olympic cross-country skiers of Yugoslavia
Cross-country skiers at the 1936 Winter Olympics
Skiers from Ljubljana